Barford may refer to:

Places

England
Barford, Hampshire
Barford, Norfolk
Barford, Warwickshire
Barford St. John, Oxfordshire
The parish of Barford St. John and St. Michael, Oxfordshire
Barford St Martin, Wiltshire
Barford St. Michael, Oxfordshire
Great Barford, Bedfordshire
Little Barford, Bedfordshire
Little Barford Power Station

Canada
Barford, Quebec, former township, now part of Coaticook

People
 Anne Barford, American rugby union player
 David Barford, British medical researcher
 Ian Barford, American actor
 John Leslie Barford (1886-1937), English poet
 Serie Barford, New Zealand performance poet
 Vernon Barford (1876-1963), English photographer and musician
 William Barford (died 1792), English scholar and clergyman

Other uses
 Barford Park, country house and park near Bridgwater, Somerset, England

See also
 Barfield (disambiguation)